Ijdanak (also Romanized as Ījdānak) is a village in Behnamvasat-e Jonubi Rural District, Javadabad District, Varamin County, Tehran Province, Iran. At the 2006 census, its population was 121, in 36 families.

References 

Populated places in Varamin County